Dagenham Park Football Club was a football club based in Dagenham, England.

History
Founded following World War II by officials of Dagenham Town, Dagenham British Legion joined the London League, winning Division One in the first season of the club. Dagenham British Legion also entered the FA Cup for the first time in the 1946–47 season, losing 8–1 away to Harwich & Parkeston. In 1954, Dagenham British Legion evolved into Dagenham Park, remaining in the London League.

Ground
The club initially played at the Merry Fiddlers Ground in Becontree Heath, before moving to Glebe Road in Dagenham.

Records
Best FA Cup performance: First qualifying round, 1947–48

References

London League (football)
Sport in the London Borough of Barking and Dagenham
Dagenham
1946 establishments in England
Association football clubs established in 1946
1955 disestablishments in England
Association football clubs disestablished in 1955
Defunct football clubs in London